Geoff Smith may refer to:

Geoff Smith (music composer) (born 1966), English composer, academic and vice chancellor of Regent's University London
Geoff Smith (footballer, born 1928) (1928–2013), English footballer
Geoff Smith (politician) (born 1934), former Australian politician
Geoff Smith (Essex cricketer) (born 1935), former English cricketer
Geoff Smith (Kent cricketer) (1925–2016), English amateur cricketer
Geoff Smith (New Zealand cricketer) (born 1953), cricketer for Canterbury
Geoff Smith (cyclist) (1942–2018), Australian Olympic cyclist
Geoff Smith (decathlete) (born 1945), Australian decathlete
Geoff Smith (Australian footballer) (born 1948), Australian rules footballer
Geoff Smith (runner) (born 1953), British marathon runner
Geoff Smith (mathematician) (born 1953), former leader of the United Kingdom International Mathematical Olympiad team
Geoff Smith (businessman) (born 1955), Canadian businessman
Geoff Smith (British musician) (born 1961), English musician
Geoff Smith (ice hockey) (born 1969), former National Hockey League defenceman

See also
Geoffrey Smith (disambiguation)
Jeff Smith (disambiguation)